The House of Eric was a medieval Swedish royal dynasty with several pretenders to the throne between 1150 and 1220, rivaling for kingship of Sweden with the House of Sverker. The first king from the House of Eric was Eric IX of Sweden, also known as Saint Eric, from whom it got its name. Almost all the subsequent kings of Sweden have been descendants of the House of Eric.

The House of Eric favored the Varnhem Abbey, and several of its members are interred there.

Foremother of the dynasty was Eric IX's wife Christina Björnsdotter, whom legend claims to have been the maternal granddaughter of King Inge I of Sweden, who abolished paganism.

The female first name Catherine seems to have been favored within the Erik dynasty.

History
The ancestral estates of the klan appear to have been Västergötland.

Two branches of the dynasty came into conflict in 1226. Canute the Tall, allegedly the adult heir of Filip, younger son of Eric IX, deposed the underage Eric XI, the Lisp and Lame (läspe och halte), who resumed the kingship in 1234. Conflict continued between the royal senior branch and Canute's two sons until the sons were executed in 1248 and 1251.

Eric XI was the last king of the agnatic line of this dynasty.  He died in 1250 and apparently left no surviving children. Though some romantic genealogies, and later research influenced by them, have attributed one or two daughters to him, they were more likely daughters of his sister and Birger jarl.  Eric XI's nephew, the then underage son of his sister Ingeborg, was elected king Valdemar I of Sweden, under the regency of his father Birger Jarl.

Descent from this house was regarded as such hard currency in medieval and early modern power games that some aspirants (most notably Charles VIII of Sweden) even fabricated a descent (see Tofta, Adelsö) to show that they too were heirs of the House of Erik.

See also
 List of Swedish monarchs

References

External links

 
Erican